Uriburu is a Basque language surname of Basque origin, which means "head of town" in the Basque language, from uri ("town") and buru ("head" or "high part"). An alternative spelling is Uruburu. The surname may refer to: 

Federico Uruburu (1934–2003), Spanish biologist
Francisco Uriburu (1837–1906), Argentine businessman and politician
José Félix Uriburu (1868–1932), Argentine general and President
José Evaristo Uriburu (1831–1914), Argentine politician and President  
José C. Uriburu (1914–1996), Argentina politician
Mario Uriburu (1901–1964), Argentine sailor
Nicolás García Uriburu (born 1937), Argentine artist

References

Basque-language surnames